Old Hutton is a village in South Lakeland, Cumbria, England. It is in the civil parish of Old Hutton and Holmescales In the 2001 census the parish had a population of 357, increasing  at the 2011 census to 417.

The parish church, dedicated to St John the Baptist, is in the Kendal Deanery of the Diocese of Carlisle.

See also

Listed buildings in Old Hutton and Holmescales

References

External links

Cumbria County History Trust: Old Hutton with Holmescales (nb: provisional research only – see Talk page)

 Historical and genealogical sources

Villages in Cumbria
South Lakeland District